Inland Empire Magazine is a lifestyle magazine focused on entertainment, dining, and other topics related to the Inland Empire Metropolitan Area of Southern California. The magazine was established in 1976. The owner and publisher is Samantha Smith. The magazine's offices are located in Riverside, California.

References

External links

1977 establishments in California
Lifestyle magazines published in the United States
Local interest magazines published in the United States
Monthly magazines published in the United States
Inland Empire
Magazines established in 1977
Magazines published in California
Mass media in Riverside, California